This is a list of French historians limited to those with a biographical entry in either English or French Wikipedia. Major chroniclers, annalists, philosophers, or other writers are included, if they have important historical output. Names are listed alphabetically by last name in each section, except for the  section, where they are ordered by date of birth.

Introduction 

History only matured as a serious academic profession in the 19th century. Before that, it was exercised as a literary pursuit by amateurs such as Voltaire, Jules Michelet, and François Guizot. The transition to an academic discipline first occurred in Germany under historian Leopold von Ranke who began offering his university seminar in history in 1833. Similar introduction of the discipline into academia in France took place in the 1860s. Historians active in France at the time such as  who were active at that time inherited the principles of a new academic discipline from Ranke and earlier mentors including Numa Denis Fustel de Coulanges.

Middle Ages 
 listed by date of birth:

 Richerus, monk and historian
 Geoffrey of Villehardouin (1150 - 1210), chronicler of the Fourth Crusade; his account of the Conquest of Constantinople is the oldest surviving historical writing in French.
 Enguerrand de Monstrelet (c. 1400–1453), chronicler
 Thomas Basin (1412–1491)
 Mathieu d'Escouchy (1420–1482), chronicler
 Jean Molinet (1435–1507), chronicler
 Philippe de Commines (1447–1511)

16th and 17th centuries 
 listed alphabetically by last name (this, and all subsequent sections):

 Joseph Justus Scaliger (1540 - 1609)

18th century 

 Pauline de Lézardière (1754–1835), law historian
 Charles Dezobry (1798–1871), historian and historical novelist
 François Guizot (1787–1874), historian of general French, English history
 Louis Gabriel Michaud (1773–1858)
 François Mignet (1796–1884), historian of the Revolution, Middle Ages
 Adolphe Thiers (1797–1877), historian of the Revolution, Empire

19th century 

 François Victor Alphonse Aulard (1849–1928), French Revolution and Napoleon I
 Marc Bloch (1886–1944), medievalist and co-founder of the Annales school
 Pierre Caron (1875–1952), French revolution
 Augustin Cochin (1876–1916), French Revolution
 Léopold Delisle (1826–1910), historian and librarian
 Bernard Faÿ (1893–1978), unique in straddling the divide in transatlantic historiography in the heritage of the Englightenment, but also a supporter of the Catholic authoritarian right and a virulent agent of Vichy oppression
 Lucien Febvre (1878–1956), early modern Europe; co-founder of Annales school
 Numa Denis Fustel de Coulanges (1830 – 1889) antiquity; political institutions of Roman Gaul; originator of history as a rigorous academic discipline in France, after the techniques first established in Germany by Ranke in the 1830s
 Étienne Gilson (1884–1978), history of philosophy; a traditionalist, with his study of history rooted in religious faith
 Élie Halévy (1870–1937), 19th c. British history; European socialism, with a distinctive, philosophical style
 Henri Hauser (1866–1946), historian, economist, geographer
 Paul Hazard (1878–1944), polymath, traveler, a founder of comparative literature, intellectual historian, his views of early modern Europe are highly influential
 Auguste Himly (1823–1906), historian and geographer
 François Christophe Edmond de Kellermann (1802–1868), political historian
 Ernest Labrousse (1895–1988), influential economic historian of 18th c. France
 Ernest Lavisse (1842–1922), French history
 Georges Lefebvre (1874–1959), proponent of the orthodox, social interpretation of the causes of the French Revolution in the Jaurès tradition, plus its impact on the peasantry; controversial for his leftist politics
 Ferdinand Lot (1866–1952), medievalist, focusing on transition from late antiquity to the Middle Ages
 Albert Mathiez (1874–1932), preeminent authority on the French Revolution
 Henri Pirenne (1862–1935), monumental study of Belgian history; medieval cities and economy 
 Ernest Renan (1823–1892), religion, including a 5-volume history of Christianity including a history of Jesus on historical principles
  (1871–1946), a pioneer in early 20th c. French rural historical studies, working in a transitional period where 19th c. historical and philosophical traditions were giving way to new social sciences of the 1920s and 30s
 Gustave Schlumberger (1844–1929)
  (1864–1936), rural society, economics, Middle Ages
 François Simiand (1873–1935), an economist by training and a sociologist, he sought to reform and unify the methodology and practice of all social/human sciences to follow sociological practice and encourage the use of empirical rather than deductive methods
 Hippolyte Taine (1828–1893), French Revolution

20th century 

  (1926–2014), French history of the 19th and 20th centuries
 Henri Amouroux (1920–2007), Nazi occupation of France
 Philippe Ariès (1914–1984), cultural history, with focus on the changing nature of childhood, and attitudes toward death
 Jacques Berque (1910–1995), Arab world; European colonization and decolonization in the modern era
 Fernand Braudel (1902–1985), early modern Europe and the Mediterranean
  (1930–2013); contemporary history; one of the first to consider French historiography
 Michel de Certeau (1925–1986), multidisciplinary Jesuit scholar of philosophy, religion, psychoanalysis, and history
 Véronique Chankowski (born 1971), economic and social history of the ancient Greek world
 Roger Chartier (1945– ), books, publishing, reading; print culture and reading practices
 Pierre Chaunu (1923–2009), Latin American religious and demographic history; legacy of the French Revolution; contemporary national debates
 Louis Chevalier (1911–2001), population changes in 19th c. Paris 
 Alain Corbin (1936– ) Limousin; daily life, emotions, and sensory experience
 Jean Delumeau (1923–2020), early modern Europe (esp. France, Italy); Christianity as lived by the masses
  (1909–1998), German world, political philosophies, diplomacy
 Georges Duby (1919–1996), social and economy of medieval France and Europe
 Jean-Baptiste Duroselle (1917–1994), French diplomacy
 Marc Ferro (1924–2021), his magnum opus Histoire de France is a rare, 20th century account of all of French history written by a single historian, and not entirely in accord with his Annales school beliefs
 Michel Foucault (1926–1984), theories of the structure of power in societies; enormously innovative and influential in a wide range of studies, esp. in the area of cultural history, penology, and sexuality
 Bruno Fuligni (born 1968), French history
 François Furet (1927–1997), key in leading the "exodus of French intellectuals from Marxism", his works went beyond academics to the educated public
 Jacques Godechot (1907–1989), prolific writer about links between the French Revolution and other revolutions, but also counter-revolution, espionage, the press, the Army, and the south of France
 Pierre Goubert (1915–2012), 17th c. peasant life; Beauvais; demographic, economic, and social history
 Michel Kaplan (born 1946), French Byzantinist
 Jack Le Goff (1924–2014), a leader of the Annales school, and world-renowned medievalist and "mass media star" for his accessible publications and tv appearances, and a founder of historical anthropology
 Emmanuel Le Roy Ladurie (born 1929), French peasantry of the early modern period; long-term continuities and demographic equilibrium of the 14th-17th c.
 Hélène Miard-Delacroix (born 1959), Franco-German relations
 Roland Mousnier (1907–1993), prolific and influential conservative and traditionalist (against the prevailing ) interpreter of institutions, the venality of nobles, and society
 Pierre Nora (1931–?), Algeria, "national memory", and a dual career in academia and publishing, reaching a wider audience through new collections issued through Gallimard; French historiography
 Michelle Perrot (1928–?), prisons, labor, and women's history
 René Rémond (1918–2007), politics and religion in modern France
 Daniel Roche (1935–?), did long-series archival work in social phenomena, and was the outstanding exponent of the Annales school approach to cultural history, esp. regarding the last century leading up to the Revolution.
 Henry Rousso (1954–?), a leading contemporary historian specializing in the Vichy regime
 George Rudé (1910–1993), French revolution
 (1905–1960), medieval rural history, especially of Bourgogne
 Albert Soboul (1914–1982), prolific author on the French revolution based on formidable erudition and meticulous archival work, from a controversial, Marxist point of view
 Jean-Pierre Vernant (1914–2007), French, ancient Greece
 Paul Veyne (born 1930), French, ancient Greece and Rome
 Pierre Vidal-Naquet (1930–2006), French, ancient Greece, civil rights activist
 Michel Vovelle (1933–2018), social and cultural history of 18th and 19th c.
 Eugen Weber (1925–2007), modern French

See also 

 Historiography of the French Revolution
 List of historians

Notes and references 

Notes

Citations

Works cited 

  
 
  
  
  
  
  
  
  
  
  
  
  
  
  
  
  
  
  
  
  
  
  
  
  
  
  
  
  
  
  
  
  
  
  
  
  
  
  
  
  
  
  
  

  
  
  
  
  

Historians
French historians
Historians
Lists of scholars and academics
French